Joel Amartey (born 2 September 1999) is an Australian rules footballer who plays for the Sydney Swans in the Australian Football League (AFL). He was recruited by the Sydney Swans with the 28th draft pick in the 2018 AFL rookie draft.

Early football
Amartey was born in Australia to a father who had migrated from Ghana. As a child, he played soccer, but quit after experiencing racial abuse, moving instead to basketball and later to Australian rules. He played junior football for the Beaumaris Football Club in the South Metro Junior Football League, alongside many of his future teammates at the Swans such as Callum Sinclair and Oliver Florent. Amartey and Florent also played football together on the same school team at Mentone Grammar. He played for the Sandringham Dragons in the NAB League, playing 14 games and kicking 9 goals over the course of the 2017 season. Amarety had the opportunity to win the grand final for the Dragons in their premiership match against the Geelong Falcons as he marked in front of goal with seconds left, meaning he had to kick a goal after the siren. Unfortunately, he missed the shot, and the Dragons lost by two points.

AFL career
Amartey was likely to make his AFL debut in July 2020, but suffered a groin injury in a scratch match and was unable to debut for the Swans. On debut, Amartey collected 3 disposals, 8 hitouts, and 2 tackles. Amartey was upgraded from the rookie list at the conclusion of the season.

Statistics
Updated to the end of the 2022 season.

|-
| 2018 ||  || 46
| 0 || — || — || — || — || — || — || — || — || — || — || — || — || — || — || — || —
|-
| 2019 ||  || 46
| 0 || — || — || — || — || — || — || — || — || — || — || — || — || — || — || — || —
|-
| 2020 ||  || 46
| 1 || 0 || 0 || 3 || 0 || 3 || 0 || 2 || 8 || 0.0|| 0.0 || 3.0 || 0.0 || 3.0 || 0.0 || 2.0 || 8.0
|-
| 2021 ||  || 36
| 6 || 5 || 3 || 38 || 17 || 55 || 16 || 23 || 49 || 0.8 || 0.5 || 6.3 || 2.8 || 9.2 || 2.7 || 3.8 || 8.2
|-
| 2022 ||  || 36
| 6 || 5 || 3 || 29 || 14 || 43 || 12 || 14 || 18 || 0.8 || 0.5 || 4.8 || 2.3 || 7.2 || 2.0 || 2.3 || 3.0
|- class=sortbottom
! colspan=3 | Career
! 13 !! 10 !! 6 !! 70 !! 31 !! 101 !! 28 !! 39 !! 75 !! 0.8 !! 0.5 !! 5.4 !! 2.4 !! 7.8 !! 2.2 !! 3.0 !! 5.8
|}

References

External links

1999 births
Living people
Sydney Swans players
Australian people of Ghanaian descent
Australian rules footballers from Melbourne
Sandringham Dragons players
Sportsmen from Victoria (Australia)
People from Beaumaris, Victoria
People educated at Mentone Grammar School